Frank Iodice is an Italian writer.

Biography
Frank Iodice was born in Naples, Italy, and he has since split his time living between Italy, France, and the United States.

Writing
Iodice is known for basing his literary works on experiences he has had while travelling internationally. His fiction is also known for focusing on the human condition and internal dialogue of emotions. He has written books in both the Italian and French languages, with those books then being translated into further languages after his initial publications, including English, Spanish, and Portuguese.

Books
In 2003 he released his novel Anne et Anne, which centers on the theme of seduction. In 2006 he published the short story collection La fabbrica delle ragazze, and he later published an additional collection in 2014 entitled La Catedral del tango. In 2011 Iodice published his work Kindo – La folle vita di uno scrittore, a novel based upon a male protagonist who is bewitching to women yet cannot be tempted by their wiles. The following year, in 2012, he then released his book Acropolis. In 2013 he then published his work I disinnamorati, a police mystery. In 2014 he released his book Le api di ghiaccio, a novel based upon the fictional travels and adventures of psychiatrist Marcel Fontaine while trying to find a missing elderly patient alongside the patient’s daughter.

In 2014 he travelled to Montevideo, Uruguay to begin researching a book that would become the book Breve dialogo sulla felicità, which centers on the life of former Uruguayan President José “Pepe” Mujica. Ten thousand copies of the book were printed and distributed for free to local school children. In between this time he also published the books Un perfetto idiota in 2017, as well as the 2018 books Matroneum and La meccanica dei sentimenti.

References

21st-century Italian writers
Writers from Naples
Italian biographers
Italian mystery writers
Year of birth missing (living people)
Living people